In the mathematical field of Lorentzian geometry, a Cauchy surface is a certain kind of submanifold of a Lorentzian manifold. In the application of Lorentzian geometry to the physics of general relativity, a Cauchy surface is usually interpreted as defining an "instant of time"; in the mathematics of general relativity, Cauchy surfaces are important in the formulation of the Einstein equations as an evolutionary problem.

They are named for French mathematician Augustin-Louis Cauchy (1789-1857) due to their relevance for the Cauchy problem of general relativity.

Informal introduction 
Although it is usually phrased in terms of general relativity, the formal notion of a Cauchy surface can be understood in familiar terms. Suppose that humans can travel at a maximum speed of 20 miles per hour. This places constraints, for any given person, upon where they can reach by a certain time. For instance, it is impossible for a person who is in Mexico at 3 o'clock to arrive in Libya by 4 o'clock; however it is possible for a person who is in Manhattan at 1 o'clock to reach Brooklyn by 2 o'clock, since the locations are ten miles apart. So as to speak semi-formally, ignore time zones and travel difficulties, and suppose that travelers are immortal beings who have lived forever.

The system of all possible ways to fill in the four blanks in

defines the notion of a causal structure. A Cauchy surface for this causal structure is a collection of pairs of locations and times such that, for any hypothetical traveler whatsoever, there is exactly one location and time pair in the collection for which the traveler was at the indicated location at the indicated time.

There are a number of uninteresting Cauchy surfaces. For instance, one Cauchy surface for this causal structure is given by considering the pairing of every location with the time of 1 o'clock (on a certain specified day), since any hypothetical traveler must have been at one specific location at this time; furthermore, no traveler can be at multiple locations at this time. By contrast, there cannot be any Cauchy surface for this causal structure that contains both the pair (Manhattan, 1 o'clock) and (Brooklyn, 2 o'clock) since there are hypothetical travelers that could have been in Manhattan at 1 o'clock and Brooklyn at 2 o'clock.

There are, also, some more interesting Cauchy surfaces which are harder to describe verbally. One could define a function τ from the collection of all locations into the collection of all times, such that the gradient of τ is everywhere less than 1/20 hours per mile. Then another example of a Cauchy surface is given by the collection of pairs

The point is that, for any hypothetical traveler, there must be some location  which the traveler was at, at time ; this follows from the intermediate value theorem.

The physical theories of special relativity and general relativity define causal structures which are schematically of the above type ("a traveler either can or cannot reach a certain spacetime point from a certain other spacetime point"), with the exception that locations and times are not cleanly separable from one another. Hence one can speak of Cauchy surfaces for these causal structures as well.

Mathematical definition and basic properties 
Let  be a Lorentzian manifold. One says that a map  is an inextensible differentiable timelike curve in  if:
 it is differentiable
  is timelike for each  in the interval 

The following is automatically true of a Cauchy surface :

It is hard to say more about the nature of Cauchy surfaces in general. The example of

as a Cauchy surface for Minkowski space  makes clear that, even for the "simplest" Lorentzian manifolds, Cauchy surfaces may fail to be differentiable everywhere (in this case, at the origin), and that the homeomorphism  may fail to be even a -diffeomorphism.

Furthermore, at the cost of not being able to consider arbitrary Cauchy surface, it is always possible to find smooth Cauchy surfaces (Bernal & Sánchez 2003):

Cauchy developments
Let  be a time-oriented Lorentzian manifold. One says that a map  is a past-inextensible differentiable causal curve in  if:
 it is differentiable
  is either future-directed timelike or future-directed null for each  in the interval 
  does not approach a limit as  decreases to 
One defines a future-inextensible differentiable causal curve by the same criteria, with the phrase "as  decreases to " replaced by "as  increases to ". One defines the past Cauchy development  by the same criteria, replacing "past-inextensible" with "future-inextensible".

Informally:

The Cauchy development  is the union of the future Cauchy development and the past Cauchy development.

Discussion 
The Cauchy surface is defined rigorously in terms of intersections with inextensible curves in order to deal with this case of circular time. An inextensible curve is a curve with no ends: either it goes on forever, remaining timelike or null, or it closes in on itself to make a circle, a closed non-spacelike curve.

When there are closed timelike curves, or even when there are closed non-spacelike curves, a Cauchy surface still determines the future, but the future includes the surface itself. This means that the initial conditions obey a constraint, and the Cauchy surface is not of the same character as when the future and the past are disjoint.

If there are no closed timelike curves, then given  a partial Cauchy surface and if , the entire manifold, then  is a Cauchy surface.  Any surface of constant  in Minkowski space-time is a Cauchy surface.

Cauchy horizon 

A clear physical example of a Cauchy horizon is the second horizon inside a charged or rotating black hole. The outermost horizon is an event horizon, beyond which information cannot escape, but where the future is still determined from the conditions outside. Inside the inner horizon, the Cauchy horizon, the singularity is visible and to predict the future requires additional data about what comes out of the singularity.

Since a black hole Cauchy horizon only forms in a region where the geodesics are outgoing, in radial coordinates, in a region where the central singularity is repulsive, it is hard to imagine exactly how it forms. For this reason, Kerr and others suggest that a Cauchy horizon never forms, instead that the inner horizon is in fact a spacelike or timelike singularity. The inner horizon corresponds to the instability due to mass inflation.

A homogeneous space-time with a Cauchy horizon is anti-de Sitter space.

See also 

 causal structure

References

Research articles
 Choquet-Bruhat, Yvonne; Geroch, Robert. Global aspects of the Cauchy problem in general relativity. Comm. Math. Phys. 14 (1969), 329–335.
 Geroch, Robert. Domain of dependence. J. Mathematical Phys. 11 (1970), 437–449.
 Bernal, Antonio N.; Sánchez, Miguel. On smooth Cauchy hypersurfaces and Geroch's splitting theorem. Comm. Math. Phys. 243 (2003), no. 3, 461–470.
 Bernal, Antonio N.; Sánchez, Miguel. Smoothness of time functions and the metric splitting of globally hyperbolic spacetimes. Comm. Math. Phys. 257 (2005), no. 1, 43–50.
Textbooks
 Beem, John K.; Ehrlich, Paul E.; Easley, Kevin L. Global Lorentzian geometry. Second edition. Monographs and Textbooks in Pure and Applied Mathematics, 202. Marcel Dekker, Inc., New York, 1996. xiv+635 pp. 
 Choquet-Bruhat, Yvonne. General relativity and the Einstein equations. Oxford Mathematical Monographs. Oxford University Press, Oxford, 2009. xxvi+785 pp. 
 Hawking, S.W.; Ellis, G.F.R. The large scale structure of space-time. Cambridge Monographs on Mathematical Physics, No. 1. Cambridge University Press, London-New York, 1973. xi+391 pp.
 O'Neill, Barrett. Semi-Riemannian geometry. With applications to relativity. Pure and Applied Mathematics, 103. Academic Press, Inc. [Harcourt Brace Jovanovich, Publishers], New York, 1983. xiii+468 pp. 
 Penrose, Roger. Techniques of differential topology in relativity. Conference Board of the Mathematical Sciences Regional Conference Series in Applied Mathematics, No. 7. Society for Industrial and Applied Mathematics, Philadelphia, Pa., 1972. viii+72 pp.
 Wald, Robert M. General relativity. University of Chicago Press, Chicago, IL, 1984. xiii+491 pp. ; 0-226-87033-2

Partial differential equations
Lorentzian manifolds